Breaking Into Society is a 1923 American silent comedy film directed by Hunt Stromberg and starring Carrie Clark Ward, Bull Montana, and Kalla Pasha.

Plot
As described in a film magazine review, the O'Toole's of Tin Can Alley inherit a great fortune. Determined to achieve a position in society, they settle Pasadena and entertain there in a lavish scale. However, their manners and disposition to rush matters get them into various scrapes. The final touch comes when a boxer and his bride from Chatham Square, an old pal of Tim O'Toole from the Alley days, without waiting for an invitation, pays the family a visit. A lurid time results, as stories of former fights are related and profusely illustrated, and all table rules are ruthlessly smashed. Finally, the horrified guests make a hasty getaway.

Cast

References

Bibliography
 Munden, Kenneth White. The American Film Institute Catalog of Motion Pictures Produced in the United States, Part 1. University of California Press, 1997.

External links

1923 films
1923 comedy films
Silent American comedy films
Films directed by Hunt Stromberg
American silent feature films
1920s English-language films
Film Booking Offices of America films
1920s American films